Taras (Daniel) Gabora is a violinist and prominent violin teacher. He was born in Yellow Creek, Saskatchewan, 23 Apr 1932.

Early life
He studied at the University of Manitoba with Richard Seaborn, at the Paris Conservatory 1952-3 with René Benedetti, in Vienna 1953-7 with Ernst Morawec, and in Amsterdam 1957-8 with Szymon Goldberg. (He worked later - 1969 - with Yuri Jankelevich in Salzburg.) In 1956, on graduating from the Vienna Academy of Music, he received the Austrian Grand Prize.

Career
Gabora settled in Montreal in 1962. He founded the Gabora String Quartet (1964-8), the Groupe baroque de Montréal in 1968 with Gaston Germain, and Les Jeunes Solistes de Montréal in 1977, a group of 16.

Gabora taught at McGill University from 1962-4 and at the JMC Orford Art Centre from 1972-4. He also taught at the Conservatoire de Musique du Québec in the 70's.

Gabora performed on CBC radio and TV and in concerts in Canada, the USA, and Europe

In 1974 he made an LP with his wife, the soprano Gaelyne Gabora.

References
Canadian Encyclopedia
Friends Along the Way: A Journey Through Jazz - Gene Lees
The Strad: A Monthly Journal for Professionals and Amateurs of All Stringed Instruments Played with the Bow Volume 103, Numbers 1221-1226

External links
Official website
Taras Gabora at Discogs

1932 births
Canadian classical violinists
Canadian male violinists and fiddlers
Living people
Academic staff of McGill University
Musicians from Montreal
Musicians from Saskatchewan
University of Manitoba alumni
21st-century Canadian violinists and fiddlers
21st-century Canadian male musicians